Prochola obstructa is a moth of the family Agonoxenidae. It is found in Ecuador.

References

Moths described in 1915
Agonoxeninae
Moths of South America
Taxa named by Edward Meyrick